Peyman Miri  is an Iranian football forward who currently plays for Iranian football club Naft Masjed Soleyman in the Persian Gulf Pro League.

References

External links
 
 Peyman Miri at Soccerway 
 Peyman Miri  PersianLeague.com 
 Peyman Miri  FFIRI.IR

1992 births
Living people
Iranian footballers
Siah Jamegan players
Havadar S.C. players
Association football midfielders